Cinitapride (trade names Cintapro, Pemix) is a gastroprokinetic agent and antiemetic agent of the benzamide class which is marketed in India, Mexico, Pakistan and Spain. It acts as an agonist of the 5-HT1 and 5-HT4 receptors and as an antagonist of the 5-HT2 receptors.

Uses 
It is indicated for the treatment of gastrointestinal disorders associated with motility disturbances such as gastroesophageal reflux disease, non-ulcer dyspepsia and delayed gastric emptying. It may be also used in the management of nausea and vomiting.

See also 
 Benzamide
 Gastroprokinetic agent

References 

4-Amino-N-(3-(diethylamino)propyl)-2-methoxybenzamides
Nitrobenzenes
Piperidines
Serotonin receptor agonists
Cyclohexenes